Ali Koli (also Romanized as ‘Alī Kolī; also known as Emāmīyeh) is a village in Borj-e Akram Rural District, in the Central District of Fahraj County, Kerman Province, Iran. At the 2006 census, its population was 87, in 19 families.

References 

Populated places in Fahraj County